Cryptoschizotrema is a genus of lichen-forming fungi in the family Graphidaceae. It has two species. The genus was circumscribed in 2019 by lichenologists André Aptroot, Robert Lücking, and Marcela Cáceres. The genus name alludes to the similarity in anatomy with Schizotrema species. This resemblance is due to the partially , concentrically layered, and fissured , which gives the impression that the Schizotrema-like excipulum is concealed beneath a protective layer. The type species was originally described by William Nylander in 1867, as a species of Thelotrema.

Species
Species in this genus occur in Central and South America.

 Cryptoschizotrema cryptotrema 
 Cryptoschizotrema minus

References

Graphidaceae
Lichen genera
Ostropales genera
Taxa described in 2019
Taxa named by André Aptroot
Taxa named by Marcela Cáceres
Taxa named by Robert Lücking